"You'll Always Find Your Way Back Home" is a country pop song written for the 2009 film Hannah Montana: The Movie. The song is performed by Hannah Montana, a character Miley Cyrus portrays in the film. The song was written by American singer-songwriter Taylor Swift and American singer Martin Johnson. A karaoke version of the song is available in the soundtrack's karaoke series. The song is musically country pop and pop rock. Lyrically, the track is about staying grounded and going back to one's roots.

The song received critical success for its use in the film. "You'll Always Find Your Way Back Home" was met with average-to-low commercial outcomes for Cyrus in several countries, compared to those of her previous efforts as Montana. It reached its highest international peak in the Canadian Hot 100, at number thirty-six. The song was qualified for gold by the Recording Industry Association of America (RIAA) and received a music video to coincide with the home release of Hannah Montana: The Movie.

Development
Singer-songwriter Taylor Swift became involved with Hannah Montana: The Movie when filmmakers emailed her specifically to request the use of her music in the film. Swift agreed to make a cameo appearance in the film to sing "Crazier" as well as to co-write a song with Boys Like Girls lead singer Martin Johnson. In an interview with MTV, Johnson described working with Swift:

"You'll Always Find Your Way Back Home" is used as the closing number of Hannah Montana: The Movie. In the film, Cyrus performs as popstar Hannah Montana onstage at an outdoor fundraiser to save her hometown's treasured park from developers. More than 2,000 extras were used to film the scene.

Composition

"You'll Always Find Your Way Back Home", according to AllMusic, embodies the album's theme of merging country and pop music. It is set in common time with a fast rock tempo of 160 beats per minute. The song is written in the key of E♭ major. Cyrus' vocals span one octave, from B♭3 to B4. The song has the following chord progression, E♭5—D5—E♭5. Like the film, the lyrics discuss importance of one's roots. Warren Truitt of About.com believed it conveyed "the sentiment that even pop stars find safe haven in their home town".
The first few lyrics of the song's chorus are almost identical to the opening verse in Hilary Duff's song "So Yesterday", which was released in 2003.

Critical reception
The song received positive reviews from critics. Simon Weaving of Screenwize.com said the film's conflicts are "mostly expressed in the simple, sugared lyrics of a series of pop hits that seamlessly find their way into the story—including 'The Best of Both Worlds' and 'You'll Always Find a Way Back Home'." James Plath of Dvdtown.com described the song as being "integrated pretty well into the narrative". Peter Canavese of Grouncho Reviews said "the story makes way  for [...] 'You'll Always Find Your Way Back Home'", which would attract "the film's target audience of pre-teen girls". Warren of Truitt of About.com listed the song as the third best song by Hannah Montana. The song was included on the short list for Best Original Song at the 82nd Academy Awards.

Chart performance
The song made its debut on the Billboard Hot 100 at number eighty-seven on the week ending April 11, 2009. "You'll Always Find Your Way Back Home" fell one spot to number eighty-eight in the following week, but on the week ending May 2, 2009 it reached its peak on the Hot 100 at number eighty-one due to digital downloads that placed it at number fifty-two on Hot Digital Songs. In the Canadian Hot 100, "You'll Always Find Your Way Back Home" debuted at eighty-eight on the week ending April 11, 2009 and reached its peak at number seventy-six on the week ending May 2, 2009.

Music video
A promotional music video for "You'll Always Find Your Way Back Home" was filmed in correlation to the Hannah Montana: The Movie soundtrack. The video, part of a series of promotional videos titled The Miley Sessions, was released in March 2009 on Disney.com and features Cyrus singing in a vacant recording studio.

An excerpt from Hannah Montana: The Movie premiered as the song's music video in August 2009 on Disney Channel to promote the home release of the film. The video begins with Cyrus and her backup dancers atop a stage in a crowded outdoor concert. Cyrus is dressed as Hannah Montana and is wearing a business suit. As Cyrus begins singing, she and the dancers engage in intricate choreography. The video then transitions to a clip from Hannah Montana: The Movie in which Cyrus' character is getting down from a private airplane. The video continues to alternate between Cyrus performing and more film clips; scenes include Stewart taking off her Hannah Montana wig and interacting with Travis Body, her love interest in the film, portrayed by actor Lucas Till. Midway through the video, Cyrus and her dancers exit the stage through a back door and instantly enter sporting western clothing with Cyrus in a western teal button up shirt, a checkered red and white table cloth with purple ruffles pettiskirt or a petticoat, and cowboy boots. Meanwhile, as the video ends, it shows that Miley wakes up and realizes (after the earlier events from the film) it's just a dream, with Jackson's car driving through the road, and the video ends.

Charts

Certification

References

External links
The official website of Hannah Montana
The official website of Hannah Montana: The Movie

2009 songs
American country music songs
American pop rock songs
Hannah Montana songs
Songs written by Taylor Swift
Songs written by Martin Johnson (musician)
Walt Disney Records singles